In cricket, a captain is a player who leads the team and has additional roles and responsibilities. The Champions League Twenty20 (CLT20) was an international professional Twenty20 (T20) cricket league which featured the best performing teams from the domestic T20 cricket leagues of major cricketing nations, such as the Indian Premier League and Australia's Big Bash League. The league was discontinued due to a lack of interest among the fans and the sponsors. In the six editions that were played from 2009 to 2014, 63 players captained their team in at least one match.

MS Dhoni played the highest number of matches as a captain, leading the Chennai Super Kings in 23 matches with a win–loss percentage of 63.04. Among those who captained in more than ten matches, Trinidad and Tobago's Daren Ganga had the best win–loss percentage: 79.16. Among the captains with a 100% win percentage, Sydney Thunder's Brad Haddin captained the highest number of matches: six. On the other hand, Central Stags' Jamie How captained the highest number of matches without registering a win; he led his team in four matches and all of them were lost. Only three players each captained two teams in the CLT20: Gautam Gambhir led the Delhi Daredevils and the Kolkata Knight Riders, Simon Katich led the New South Wales Blues and the Perth Scorchers, and Jehan Mubarak led the Wayamba Elevens and the Southern Express.

The Highveld Lions played the highest number of matches while being under the captaincy of a single player; Alviro Petersen led the team in all of the 14 matches it played in the CLT20. Four players captained the Mumbai Indians and the Cape Cobras in the CLT20, which is the highest among all teams.

Key

List of CLT20 captains

The list includes those players who captained their team in at least one CLT20 match. The list is initially organised by the number of matches as a captain and if the numbers are tied, the list is sorted by last name.

Notes

References

See also
List of Indian Premier League captains
List of Big Bash League captains
List of Bangladesh Premier League captains
List of Pakistan Super League captains

centuries
Cricket records and statistics
Champions League Twenty20 centuries